Methyltransferase like 16 is a protein that in humans is encoded by the METTL16 gene.

References

Further reading

External links 
 PDBe-KB provides an overview of all the structure information available in the PDB for Human RNA N6-adenosine-methyltransferase METTL16